The following is a discography of Helloween, an influential German heavy metal band, credited as the "fathers" of the power metal subgenre.

Albums

Studio albums

Live albums

Compilation albums

Singles

Videography

Music videos

 "Halloween" (1987) From the album "Keeper of the Seven Keys, Part I"
 "I Want Out" (1988) From the album "Keeper of the Seven Keys, Part II"
 "Kids Of The Century" (First Version) (1991) From the album "Pink Bubbles Go Ape"
 "Kids Of The Century" (Second Version) (1991) From the album "Pink Bubbles Go Ape"
 "When The Sinner" (1993) From the album "Chameleon"
 "Mr. Ego (Take Me Down)" (1994) From the album "Master of the Rings"
 "Where The Rain Grows" (1994) From the album "Master of the Rings"
 "Perfect Gentleman" (1994) From the album "Master of the Rings"
 "Power" (1996) From the album "The Time of the Oath"
 "The Time Of The Oath" (1996) From the album "The Time of the Oath"
 "Forever And One (Neverland)" (1996) From the album "The Time of the Oath"
 "I Can" (1998) From the album "Better Than Raw"
 "Hey Lord!" (1998) From the album "Better Than Raw"
 "If I Could Fly" (2000) From the album "The Dark Ride"
 "Just A Little Sign" (2003) From the album "Rabbit Don't Come Easy"
 "Mrs. God" (2005) From the album "Keeper of the Seven Keys - The Legacy"
 "Light The Universe" (2006) From the album "Keeper of the Seven Keys - The Legacy"
 "As Long As I Fall" (2007) From the album "Gambling with the Devil"
 "Paint A New World" (2008) From the album "Gambling with the Devil"
 "Dr. Stein" (2009) From the album "Unarmed"
 "Are You Metal?" (2010) From the album "7 Sinners"
 "Nabataea" (2012) From the album "Straight Out of Hell"
 "Waiting For The Thunder" (2013) From the album "Straight Out of Hell"
 "Heroes" (2015) From the album "My God-Given Right"
 "Battle's Won" (Lyric Video) (2015) From the album "My God-Given Right"
 "My God-Given Right" (2015) From the album "My God-Given Right"
 "Lost in America" (2015) From the album "My God-Given Right"
 "Pumpkins United" (Lyric Video) (2017) From the album "Helloween"
 "Pumpkins United" (2019) From the album DVD "United Alive"
 "Halloween" (2019) From the album DVD "United Alive"
 "Forever And One (Neverland)" (2019) From the album DVD "United Alive"
 "Future World" (2019) From the album DVD "United Alive"
 "Skyfall" (2021) From the album "Helloween"
 "Fear of the Fallen" (Lyric Video) (2021) From the album "Helloween"
 "Out For The Glory" (2021) From the album "Helloween"
 "Robot King" (Lyric Video) (2021) From the album "Helloween"
 "Down In The Dumps" (Lyric Video) (2021) From the album "Helloween"
 "Skyfall" (Lyric Video) (2022) From the album "Halloween"
 "Best Time" (2022) From the album "Halloween"

References

Heavy metal group discographies
Discographies of German artists